Rancho Grande Airfield  is a privately owned public-use  airfield located in San Luis Gonzaga, Municipality of Ensenada, Baja California, Mexico, on the San Luis Gonzaga Bay located on the Gulf of California coast. The airfield is used solely for general aviation purposes. It has two dirt runways.

External links
Baja Bush Pilots forum about Rancho Grande airstrips

Airports in Baja California